Seven Mile Beach is a national park in New South Wales (Australia), 110 km southwest of Sydney.

It consists of tidal flats, islands and a coastal sand barrier built from river silt
in the Shoalhaven River delta. It is important areas for migratory waders and sea birds and protects a large littoral rainforest. The wettest month of the year is March, and the driest is September. The average temperature ranges from 17 to 25 degrees Celsius.

There are great opportunities for bird watchers. They can observe king parrots, rainbow lorikeets, rosellas, wrens, New Holland honeyeaters and brown cuckoo doves.

See also
 Protected areas of New South Wales

References

External links
Seven Mile Beach National Park at NSW National Parks and Wildlife Service website

National parks of New South Wales
Protected areas established in 1971
1971 establishments in Australia